Magar Kaike is a Sino-Tibetan language of Nepal. Ethnologue classifies it as a West Bodish language.

Kaike is spoken in Shahartara, Tupatara, Tarakot, and Belawa villages of Sahartara VDC, Dolpa District, Karnali Province, Nepal (Ethnologue).

Honda (2008) notes that Kaike shares many words with Tamangic, but is not part of Tamangic proper. It is also in contact with Tichurong, a divergent Tibetic lect spoken near the Kaike-speaking areas.

Lexicon
Honda (2008) lists the following Kaike words.

References

Languages of Nepal
Tamangic languages
Endangered Sino-Tibetan languages
Languages of Karnali Province